Flavio Asta (born 10 September 1946) is a former Italian shot putter and discus thrower two-time national champion at senior level (in shot put), who competed at two editions of the European Athletics Championships (1966, 1969).

National records
 Shot put: 18.99 m ( Verona, 17 August 1969) - record holder from 13 July 1969 to 31 July 1973

Achievements

National titles
Asta won two national championships.
 Italian Athletics Championships
 Shot put: 1969, 1974

Personal bests
Shot put: 18.99 m ( Verona, 17 August 1969)
Discus throw: 56.19 m ( Celje, 15 August 1966)

References

External links
 
 Flavio Asta at LesSports.info
 Flavio Asta at Atletica.me

1946 births
Italian male javelin throwers
Italian masters athletes
Living people
Sportspeople from Padua
Athletics competitors of Centro Sportivo Carabinieri